

Laguna Consuelo is a lake in the Santa Cruz Department, Bolivia. Its surface area is 2.6 km².

References 

Lakes of Santa Cruz Department (Bolivia)